Khalid Eisa Mohammed Bilal Saeed Al Mesmari (born 15 September 1989) is an Emirati professional association football goalkeeper who plays for Emirati club Al Ain and the United Arab Emirates national team. He competed at the 2012 Summer Olympics and the 2018 FIFA Club World Cup.

Club career

Al Jazira

Al Ain
On 17 July 2013, Khalid moved to Al Ain in undisclosed deal.

Honours

Club
Al Jazira
UAE Pro League: 2010–11
UAE League Cup: 2009–10
UAE President's Cup: 2010–11, 2011–12
Al Ain
UAE Pro League: 2014–15, 2017–18, 2021–22
UAE League Cup: 2021–22
UAE President's Cup: 2013–14, 2017–18
UAE Super Cup: 2015
AFC Champions League runner-up: 2016
FIFA Club World Cup runner-up: 2018

International
United Arab Emirates
Gulf Cup of Nations (1): 2013
AFC Asian Cup third-place (1): 2015

Individual
 Arabian Gulf Cup Best Goalkeeper: 2018
 Pro League Goalkeeper of the Month: October 2021, November 2021, February 2022, March 2022
AFC Champions League Player of the week: 2017

References

External links

 
 
 
 Khalid Eisa at Football Database
 Khalid Eisa at Eurosport
 Khalid Eisa at UAEProLeague

1989 births
Living people
Emirati footballers
Olympic footballers of the United Arab Emirates
Footballers at the 2012 Summer Olympics
2015 AFC Asian Cup players
2019 AFC Asian Cup players
Al Jazira Club players
Al Ain FC players
United Arab Emirates international footballers
UAE Pro League players
Association football goalkeepers